William Arthur Satchell (1 February 1861–21 October 1942) was a New Zealand orchardist, writer, stockbroker, novelist and accountant. 

Satchell was born in London, England in 1861. In 1886 he decided to emigrate to New Zealand for his health, and settled at Waimā in the Hokianga area of the North Island, on a property that he cleared and farmed. He married Susan Bryers at Rawene on 15 November 1889.

Between 1902 and 1914 Satchell wrote four novels, all set in New Zealand. He was granted a civil list pension in 1939 in recognition of his literary services. He died in Auckland in October 1942. His wife predeceased him by six years; he was survived by five sons and four daughters.

Books
The Land of the Lost (1902)
The Toll of the Bush (1905)
The Elixir of Life (1907)
The Greenstone Door (1914)

References

1861 births
1942 deaths
English emigrants to New Zealand
New Zealand male novelists
New Zealand horticulturists
New Zealand orchardists
20th-century New Zealand novelists
20th-century New Zealand male writers